Frank Pé, often signing solely as Frank (15 July 1956) is a Belgian comic book artist, best known for Broussaille and Zoo.

Biography
Frank Pé was born in Ixelles in 1956. After studying sculpture for three years at the Institut Saint-Luc in Brussels (with costudents like Bernard Hislaire), he began to create comics and illustrations for Spirou magazine, specializing in articles about animals. The fictional presenter of these stories, an adolescent named Broussaille, later got his own series, putting Frank in the limelight.

In the meantime, he also created L'élan, a moose whose aim in life is to have his own comic and his own albums. His first album was the one-shot Comme un animal en cage (Like an Animal in a Cage), written by Thierry Martens, then editor-in-chief at Spirou. Since 1994, he has worked on his two main series: Zoo, planned as a trilogy, and Broussaille. Zoo is a romantic and nostalgic series, while Broussaille is contemporary, allowing the author to intertwine it with his own life – featuring adventures in Brussels and in countries he has visited, such as Japan.

Frank is a slow worker, having only published 10 albums in 22 years. Over that time he has also contributed to the Warner Bros. Animation movie Quest for Camelot, but not much of his work was kept in the final film. He also makes sculptures in bronze, and has produced many illustrations for Scouting calendars. In 1993, he developed the series Matur for Kodansha.

As his main influences, he cites comics artists like André Franquin, Dany and Wasterlain, but also different artists like the sculptor Auguste Rodin, the painter Egon Schiele, and the film director Andrei Tarkovsky. Apart from art and comics, his main interest is animals. He has raised 50 reptiles, including 16 crocodiles.

Bibliography

He also contributed illustrations to Entre Chats, a 1989 book with other drawings by André Franquin, René Hausman, André Juillard and Max Cabanès, published by Delcourt.

Awards
1985: Alpages in Sierre, Switzerland
1989: Grand Prix de Grenoble, France
1990: Christian Comic Award and Audience Award at the Angoulême International Comics Festival, France
1996: Best imported comic at the Max & Moritz Prizes, Germany

In 1991, a mural painting of Broussaille was unveiled in Brussels. It was the first in a long series of now over 30 murals celebrating comic heroes in the city.

Notes

Sources
 Béra, Michel; Denni, Michel; and Mellot, Philippe (2002): "Trésors de la Bande Dessinée 2003–2004". Paris, Les éditions de l'amateur.

External links
Homepage of the author 
Biography at Dupuis
Interviews 
Biography at Comiclopedia

1956 births
Living people
Belgian comics artists